The Lausanne Opera  is an opera house based in Lausanne, Switzerland. 

Once known as a municipal theater, it has transformed into a world renowned opera house that produces and co-produces their own productions. With a stage renovation in 2012, the Lausanne Opera offers a wide variety of operas, from baroque to contemporary, along with concerts and ballets. Thanks to its bold programming and emphasis on quality vocals and stage production, the Lausanne Opera welcomes over 45'000 spectators a year and continues to make itself known internationally.

History
The opening ceremony took place on 10 May 1871.

See also
 List of opera houses
 List of opera companies in Europe

References

External links

 Official website
 Page on the website of the City of Lausanne

Theatre in Switzerland
Opera houses in Switzerland
Architecture in Switzerland
Dance in Switzerland
Theatres completed in 1871
Music venues completed in 1871
1871 establishments in Europe